Hibbertia alopecota is a species of flowering plant in the family Dilleniaceae and is endemic to the Northern Territory. It is a low shrub with elliptic to lance-shaped leaves and yellow flowers arranged singly in leaf axils, with sixteen to twenty-four stamens arranged in bundles around two carpels.

Description
Flowering occurs from February to August.

Taxonomy
Hibbertia alopecota was first formally described in 2010 by Hellmut R. Toelken in the Journal of the Adelaide Botanic Gardens from specimens collected near Fisher Creek in the Northern Territory in 1990. The specific epithet (alopecota) means "fox-ears", referring to the hairs on the outer sepal lobes.

Distribution and habitat
This hibbertia grows on sedimentary rocks in sandy soil and mostly occurs on the lower slopes of the western escarpment of the Arnhem Land Plateau in the Northern Territory.

See also
List of Hibbertia species

References

acaulothrix
Flora of the Northern Territory
Plants described in 2010
Taxa named by Hellmut R. Toelken